Kate Pullinger is a Canadian novelist and author of digital fiction, and a professor of Creative Writing at Bath Spa University, England. She was born 1961 in Cranbrook, British Columbia, Canada, and went to high school on Vancouver Island. She dropped out of McGill University, Montreal, after a year and a half and subsequently worked for a year in a copper mine in the Yukon. She then travelled and settled in London, where she now resides.

Career
Pullinger won the 2009 Governor General's Award for her novel The Mistress of Nothing, a fictionalized tale of Sally Naldrett, lady's maid to Lady Duff Gordon, who traveled with her mistress to Egypt in Victorian times. Pullinger's earlier books include the novels When the Monster Dies (1989), Where Does Kissing End? (1992), The Last Time I Saw Jane (1996), Weird Sister (1999) and A Little Stranger (2004 in Canada and 2006 in the UK), as well as the short-story collections Tiny Lies (1988) and My Life as a Girl in a Men's Prison (1997). She co-wrote the novelization of the film The Piano (1993) with director Jane Campion.

Pullinger also writes for film and for the digital media. Her most recent digital works are Flight Paths (2007–), a "networked novel" created in collaboration with worldwide participants, and Inanimate Alice (2005–), a series of multimedia novels, both created with writer/artist Chris Joseph, and The Breathing Wall (2004), experimental fiction that responds to the reader's rate of breathing, made with collaborators Stefan Schemat and Chris Joseph.

Pullinger was the lead writer on the 24hr Book Project, a project to write, edit and produce a novel in 24 hours, which was managed by CompletelyNovel.com in collaboration with if:book (a book industry think tank), the Society of Young Publishers and Spread the Word (a writer development agency).

Pullinger has been writer-in-residence at the Battersea Arts Centre, the University of Reading, the prisons HMP Gartree and HMP Maidstone, and in Maidstone itself. She was Judith E. Wilson Visiting Writing Fellow at Jesus College, University of Cambridge (1995/96), and the Visiting Writing Fellow at The Women's Library, London Metropolitan University (2001/03). She was Research Fellow for The trAce Online Writing Centre Arts and Humanities Research Board project Mapping the Transition from Page to Screen, where she investigated new forms of electronic narrative (2002/03). She taught on the MA in Creative Writing and New Media at De Montfort University, Leicester, UK, where she was Reader in Creative Writing and New Media. She is a member of the Production and Research in Transliteracy (PART) group at De Montfort, researching transliteracy. She is the Royal Literary Fund Virtual Fellow and Professor of Creative Writing at Bath Spa University.

Pullinger is an atheist.

Selected bibliography

Novels

Short stories

References

External links
Kate Pullinger
Kate Pullinger biography at British Council Literature
Dr Kate Pullinger page at De Montfort University, Leicester

1961 births
Living people
Academics of Bath Spa University
21st-century Canadian novelists
Canadian women novelists
Writers from British Columbia
Academics of De Montfort University
People from Cranbrook, British Columbia
Electronic literature writers
Governor General's Award-winning fiction writers
21st-century Canadian women writers
Canadian atheists